Rainham may refer to:

Rainham, Kent, Medway, England
Rainham railway station (Kent)
Rainham, London, London Borough of Havering, England
Rainham railway station (London)

See also
 Raynham (disambiguation)